The 1980–81 Ohio Bobcats men's basketball team represented Ohio University as a member of the Mid-American Conference in the college basketball season of 1980–81. The team was coached by Danny Nee in his first season at Ohio. They played their home games at Convocation Center. The Bobcats finished with a record of 7–20 and seventh in the MAC with a conference record of 6–10.  The 20 losses were the most in program history at the time.

Schedule

|-
!colspan=9 style=| Regular Season

|-
!colspan=9 style=| MAC Tournament

Source:

Statistics

Team Statistics
Final 1980–81 Statistics

Source

Player statistics

Source

References

Ohio Bobcats men's basketball seasons
Ohio
Ohio Bobcats men's basketball
Ohio Bobcats men's basketball